Lot 31 is a township in Queens County, Prince Edward Island, Canada.  It is part of Hillsboro Parish. Lot 31 was awarded to Adam Drummond in the 1767 land lottery. It was sold to the Earl of Selkirk in 1806.

References

31
Geography of Queens County, Prince Edward Island